Alexandros (Gr. ), the "defender of men", was an epithet of the Greek goddess Hera, under which she was worshiped at Sicyon.  A temple had been built there to Hera Alexandros by Adrastus after his flight from Argos.

Epithet 
Hera is referred to by various names one of which is the title Alexandros, "the defender of men", a name which she was worshiped under by the Sicyonian people. A temple had been built in her name by Adrastus, who was the legendary king of during the war of Seven against Thebes.

References

Epithets of Hera
Sicyon
Corinthian mythology